Porth Kea or Porthkea is a hamlet in Kea parish, south of Truro in Cornwall, England. It lies south-east of Kea village, on the other side of the A39.

Porth Kea Methodist Church was built in 1869 and extended in 1877.

References

Hamlets in Cornwall